Harold Frederick (born 18 February 1927) is a former sports shooter from the United States Virgin Islands. He competed at the 1972 Summer Olympics and the 1976 Summer Olympics.

References

External links
 

1927 births
Living people
United States Virgin Islands male sport shooters
Olympic shooters of the United States Virgin Islands
Shooters at the 1972 Summer Olympics
Shooters at the 1976 Summer Olympics
Place of birth missing (living people)